Shan Tao (born 30 May 1970) is a Chinese former basketball player who competed in the 1992 Summer Olympics and in the 1996 Summer Olympics.

References

1970 births
Living people
Sportspeople from Tangshan
Chinese men's basketball players
1990 FIBA World Championship players
Olympic basketball players of China
Basketball players at the 1992 Summer Olympics
Basketball players at the 1996 Summer Olympics
Asian Games medalists in basketball
Asian Games gold medalists for China
Basketball players at the 1990 Asian Games
Basketball players at the 1994 Asian Games
Medalists at the 1990 Asian Games
Medalists at the 1994 Asian Games
Shanxi Loongs players
Shenzhen Leopards players
Basketball players from Hebei
1994 FIBA World Championship players